Martín Enrique Castillo Ruz (born 23 January 1970) is a Mexican politician from the Institutional Revolutionary Party. From 2009 to 2012 he served as Deputy of the LXI Legislature of the Mexican Congress representing Yucatán.

References

1970 births
Living people
Politicians from Yucatán (state)
Institutional Revolutionary Party politicians
21st-century Mexican politicians
Deputies of the LXI Legislature of Mexico
Members of the Chamber of Deputies (Mexico) for Yucatán